WKAQ-TV (channel 2) is a television station in San Juan, Puerto Rico, serving as the U.S. territory's dual Telemundo and NBC outlet. It is owned and operated by the Telemundo Station Group subsidiary of NBCUniversal. WKAQ-TV's studios are located on Franklin Roosevelt Avenue in San Juan near Hiram Bithorn Stadium, and its transmitter is located on Cerro la Santa in Cayey near the Bosque Estatal de Carite mountain reserve.

WTIN-TV (channel 2.11) in Ponce and WNJX-TV (channel 2.12) in Mayagüez, branded on-air as Telemundo West, operate as full-time satellites of WKAQ-TV, which rebroadcast the station's programming to the southern and western regions of Puerto Rico under an affiliation agreement with Hemisphere Media Group (owner of parent station WAPA-TV, channel 4). WKAQ-TV formerly operated WOLE-TV (channel 12) in Aguadilla and WORA-TV (channel 5) in Mayagüez as satellite stations. WKAQ-TV also has three low-power translator facilities: W09AT-D in Fajardo, W28EH-D in Adjuntas and W28EQ-D in Utuado. WKAQ-TV also simulcasts the signal of New York City sister station WNBC with the branding of NBC Puerto Rico.

History
WKAQ-TV first signed on March 28, 1954, as the first television station in Puerto Rico. The station was founded by Ángel Ramos, owner of El Mundo (The World) and Puerto Rico's first licensed radio station, WKAQ. Ramos wanted to maintain a consistent branding inter-proprietorially using the "mundo" theme, and decided to brand WKAQ-TV as Telemundo ("Tele-World"). Ramos had tried to obtain a television station license as early as the mid-1940s, but due to a licensing freeze for all new American television stations imposed by the Federal Communications Commission (FCC), Ramos had to wait until 1954. Initially, WKAQ-TV was affiliated with CBS until 1967. WKAQ began broadcasting in color in 1968.

During the station's history, WKAQ-TV battled fiercely with WAPA-TV to become the highest-rated in Puerto Rico, in great part due to influence from Ramón Rivero (better known as Diplo), the most famous and influential comedian of Puerto Rico, who was under an exclusive contract with Ángel Ramos, and who, in 1954 produced the first comedy/variety show for WKAQ-TV, La Taberna India, followed by La Farándula Corona.

During the 1970s and 1980s, WKAQ-TV (then branded as Telemundo Canal 2) was a major producer of Puerto Rican Spanish soap operas. The station was also known by its "fingers" logo, a bold number 2 with a left-handed silhouette raising two fingers, replacing the negative space within the "2" numeral, which was used from 1976 to 1992. During this time, it called itself "El canal de los dedos" ("The channel of the fingers").

WKAQ-TV has produced and broadcast recognized local shows such as El Show de las 12, La Gente Joven de Menudo, En Casa de Juanma y Wiwi, Los Kakucómicos, Teatrimundo, Musicomedia, El Show de Chucho, Telecine de la Noche con Manolo Urquiza, Noche de Gala, Estudio Alegre, La Pensión de Doña Tere, El Show de Nydia Caro, No te Duermas, Marcano El Show, Con lo que Cuenta este País, Videoteces, Súper Sábado, Fantástico, El Tío Nobel, Telecómicas, Al Grano con Zervigón, Ahora Podemos Hablar and Dame un Break. It also produced famous telenovelas such as El Hijo de Ángela María, Tomiko, Cristina Bazán, El Ídolo, Viernes Social, La Verdadera Eva, Rojo Verano, Modelos S.A., Coralito, and Tanairi. Professional Wrestling also aired as well such as the World Wrestling Council in the early 1980s, Americas Wrestling Federation in the early 1990s, International Wrestling Association (Puerto Rico) Impacto Total and Zona Caliente and WWF Shotgun Saturday Night and Metal (1998–2001).

When Telemundo spun-off in 1987, the station started branding itself as "Telemundo Puerto Rico" (before, WKAQ-TV had branded itself as either "Telemundo" or just "Canal 2"). Since then, WKAQ-TV has since then become one of Telemundo's flagship stations, as well as the recognized original "Telemundo". It has been highly criticized that because of the station's affiliation to the Telemundo network, locally produced programming has been traded for "enlatados", or foreign Spanish programming such as Mexican and Venezuelan telenovelas. To avoid this criticism, in 2006, WKAQ-TV aired the first Puerto Rican written and produced telenovela in 15 years: Dueña y Señora. To the general population, WKAQ-TV is still known simply as "Telemundo", and it is branded as such to this day.

In 2005, WKAQ-TV became a superstation when NBC Universal reformatted its entertainment-based subscription channel Telemundo Internacional into Telemundo Puerto Rico. The channel aired WKAQ-produced programs such as No te Duermas and TVO, as well as the station's news program, Telenoticias. Telemundo Puerto Rico was aimed at Puerto Ricans and other Caribbean communities living in the mainland United States. The superstation feed, however, was reverted to Telemundo Internacional in early 2008. On October 9, 2007, NBC Universal announced that they had put WKAQ-TV up for sale, following its acquisition of Oxygen Media. However, NBC Universal took the station off the market on December 21.

On August 25, 2008, WKAQ-TV, in co-production with the Telemundo network, launched the morning news and lifestyle show Levántate from its San Juan studios. The station also began to air a local teen drama series, Zona Y, which achieved success in the Puerto Rican teen market. On April 23, 2009, WKAQ-TV became the first commercial station in Puerto Rico to begin broadcasting its programming in high definition with its telecast of the Billboard Latin Music Awards.

On June 28, 2019, WKAQ-TV entered into an agreement with Hemisphere Media Group (owner of WAPA-TV, channel 4) to broadcast Telemundo on subchannels of WTIN-TV in Ponce and WNJX-TV in Mayagüez, after WORA-TV announced that it would disaffiliate from the network by December 31. Telemundo will rebroadcast the main signal on its 24-hour schedule, except on Sundays, if WAPA chooses, and its multicast channel Punto 2 on digital subchannels 2.11 / 2.12 and 2.21 / 2.22. The new stations will use the Telemundo West branding.

Problems and possible Telemundo integration
Since the beginning of the Telemundo network, WKAQ had been operated semi-independently from the network. This allowed the station to continue to focus on local productions, with network programming utilized as filler. This had often led to Telemundo network programs not airing on the same timeframe as on the mainland, with telenovelas often falling months behind. However, years of declining ratings and local cancellations have led to unconfirmed rumors and speculation that WKAQ may become a standard Telemundo station, dropping all local programming except for Telenoticias.

WKAQ's problems began during the early 2000s, when its ratings declined significantly, mostly due to the entrance of Univision into the Puerto Rican market through WLII. Since then, local shows produced by WKAQ, such as El Gran Bejuco and Dame Un Break, that competed against Univision network offerings have slipped in the ratings, as viewers turned away from WKAQ in favor of Univision. As WKAQ's ratings continued to decline, the station began laying off staff, including Paquito Cordero, one of the most prominent producers on Puerto Rican television. His layoff led to the cancellation of El Show de las Doce, the oldest program in Puerto Rican television outside of local news programming. Many other local programs have also been canceled since then, replaced with Telemundo network programming.

Currently, WKAQ has very few non-news local programming remaining. The most recent local program to be canceled was No te Duermas, the second longest-running local program after El Show de las Doce. The few attempts made at new, locally produced programming have achieved little success, often being canceled after only a few months. Nevertheless, the station has recently become the leading station on the island in terms of viewership against WLII and WAPA, with its telenovela block dominating in the 7 to 10 p.m. time period. Additionally, since January 2009, WKAQ has aired Lost on weeknights at 10:00 p.m., leading that time slot.  Also, Día a Día has seen an increase in viewership in its 11:00 a.m. time slot, and a local teen drama Zona Y has been a great success in the teen market in Puerto Rico.

WKAQ also regained the rights to the local Miss Universe pageant, after the Miss Universe organization dismissed Magali Febles as the owner to the franchise. The organization named Luisito Vigoreaux, Desiree Lowry, and Telemundo Puerto Rico in charge of the pageant. Telemundo kept some elemental concepts, but a more direct approach is gained. (The rights to Miss Universe Puerto Rico would be eventually lost to WAPA in April 2015.)

On January 12, 2010, a new gossip show named Dando Candela began airing, with some members from WLII's former Anda Pal Cará section "El Avispero". Alexandra Fuentes, Saudi Rivera, Papo Brenes, and Harold Rosario, along with producer Soraya Sánchez, moved to Telemundo after being fired by Univision. In the premiere show, Pedro Juan Figueroa (formerly of Hector Marcano's Qué Suerte, and now at Lo Sé Todo from WAPA-TV) joined the show. It has had some controversy, but the program helped WKAQ compete with WAPA-TV's gossip show SuperXclusivo (featuring former Telemundo talent Kobbo Santarrosa and his puppet La Comay). After over 10 years on the air, Dando Candela was canceled in March 2020 due to production issues brought on by the COVID-19 pandemic.

Return to local programming
After years struggling to compete with rival WAPA and the possibility of undergoing a full integration with the mainland feed of Telemundo, WKAQ-TV has managed to return to producing local programming which in turn has lifted the channel from obscurity. As of March 2021, WKAQ-TV produces 10 hours daily of local programming on Mondays, Wednesdays, Thursdays and Fridays; while on Tuesdays, the station produces 12 hours of local programming. Some of the current shows include Hoy Dia Puerto Rico, Dia a Dia, Raymond y Sus Amigos and local newscasts Telenoticias which expanded to two hours in January 2020 and positioned itself as the leading newscast in Puerto Rico beating WAPA's NotiCentro in the same timeslot.

News operation
WKAQ-TV currently broadcasts 27 hours of locally produced newscasts each week (with five hours each on Mondays, Wednesdays, Thursdays and Fridays; 4 hours on Tuesdays; and 1 hours each on Saturdays and Sundays). Telenoticias is the name of WKAQ-TV's newscasts created by Evelio Otero, its first news anchor and original announcer when Telemundo went on the air. Otero proposed the name to Ángel Ramos, who approved it on the spot. The newscast began in 1954 and it was the first local television program in Puerto Rico. In the 1960s, a renewed edition of Telenoticias began with different anchors.

For more than twenty years, Telenoticias only had two editions: an early evening newscast at 5 p.m. and a late evening newscast at 11 p.m. However, in 2002, a weekend edition was introduced, which (like its weekday counterparts) aired at 5 and 11 p.m. In 2003, the station debuted a weekday morning newscast called Telemundo por la Mañana with Charito Fraticelli, Silverio Pérez, Lourdes Collazo, Miguel Ramos and panel experts.

In the 1990s, Telenoticias used "Telemundo 1992 News Theme" as the main theme music for its newscasts; this was replaced later by "Telemundo News Theme." In 2005, the newscasts began to use the production theme "Raw Power" from Network Music.

In 2006, as part of the "NBC Universal 2.0" restructuring, WKAQ-TV laid off 60 to 80 staffers, including some Telenoticias anchors and reporters. In addition, the morning, midday and weekend editions of Telenoticias were canceled. On January 8, 2007, Telenoticias debuted a new set, new graphics and new music. In September 2011, NBCUniversal announced that it would relaunch the 11 a.m. and weekend evening editions of Telenoticias in early 2012, as a condition by the FCC to approve the sale of a controlling stake in the company to Philadelphia-based cable provider and telecommunications company Comcast, requiring NBCUniversal's NBC and Telemundo owned-and-operated stations to increase the amount of locally produced programming. On May 29, 2014, just months after cancellation of Univision Puerto Rico's weekend newscast, WKAQ-TV announced it was going to bring back the weekend newscast. Then on May 31, a weekend newscast premiered, titled Telenoticias Fin de semana.

Primera Pregunta con Rafael Lenín Lopez
On January 31, 2023, WKAQ-TV announced that the station would be shortening the 5 p.m. edition of Telenoticias from one hour to a half hour to accommodate their new show Primera Pregunta con Rafael Lenín Lopez (First Question with Rafael Lenín Lopez). The new show will feature renowned journalist Rafael Lenín Lopez as host (Lopez is making the jump from WAPA-TV where he worked for over two decades and served as the director of their newscast NotiCentro) and will focus on political analysis, special interviews and the discussion of topics relevant to Puerto Ricans' daily lives. The show will also feature a steep list of special contributors like PNP Senator Thomas Rivera Schatz, former Puerto Rican governor Alejandro García Padilla, Carlos Díaz Olivo, Luis Pabón Roca, and Anabelle Torres Colberg. The show is set to premiere on February 13 at 5:30 p.m. and will be produced by WKAQ's news department. While it will be considered an extension of Telenoticias due to being a News Department production, the actual newscast will finish at 5:30 p.m.

Hoy Día Puerto Rico 

In December 2020, WKAQ announced that it would be relaunching its morning news operation with the launching of a new morning program set to debut in February 2021. On January 5, 2021, it was announced that Ivonne Orsini and Ramon "Gato" Gomez, who at the time worked with rival station WAPA, would be jumping to Telemundo to host the morning show. On January 13, 2021, it was announced that Orisini and Gomez would also be joined by former Senator Zoe Laboy (who at the time was also working at WAPA) for a political analysis segment. Finally, on January 19, 2021, during an interview with Día a Día, it was announced that weekend anchor Grenda Rivera and meteorologist Elizabeth Robaina would also be joining the show to host a news segment and a weather/traffic segment respectively. During this interview it was also revealed the show would be title Hoy Día Puerto Rico (utilizing the same brand of the national Telemundo morning show) and that it would have a magazine style format running from 8 to 10 a.m. on weekdays.

Hoy Día Puerto Rico premiered on February 15, 2021, emanating live from the Sandra Zaiter Studio (Studio 8) at WKAQ-TV. The inaugural broadcast featured a special interview with Puerto Rican Governor Pedro Pierluisi and the introduction of special contributors Desiree Lowry and Suzette Baco who would be returning with recurring weekly segments on the broadcasts.

On February 3, 2023, Ramón "Gato" Gómez announced he would be leaving his role as co-host of the show to join WKAQ's coverage of the 2023 Baloncesto Superior Nacional basketball tournament as an analyst. Radio personality Jacky Fontánez was announced as the show's new co-host.

Notable current on-air staff
 Jorge Rivera Nieves – anchor
 Zugey Lamela – anchor/reporter
 Sylvia Gomez – reporter
 Raymond Arrieta – Día a Día, Raymond y sus Amigos
 Carlos Díaz Olivo – political analyst
 Dagmar Rivera – Día a Día
 Alexandra Fuentes – Alexandra a las 12
 Monica Pastrana – Raymond y sus Amigos
 Alejandro García Padilla – political analyst
 Thomas Rivera Schatz - political analyst
 Juan Dalmau – political analyst
 Ivonne Orsini – host Hoy Día Puerto Rico
 René Monclova – Raymond y sus Amigos
 Desiree Lowry – collaborator Hoy Día Puerto Rico

Notable former on-air staff
Aníbal González Irizarry (deceased)
Ramón Enrique Torres (later at WTCV)
Efren Arroyo (later at WAPA-TV, deceased)
Johanna Rosaly (later at WAPA-TV)
Silverio Pérez (later at WLII-DT)
Luis Raúl (previously at WLII-DT, deceased)
Jennifer Wolff (previously at WAPA-TV and later at WLII-DT)
Hector Travieso (previously at WAPA-TV, later at WTCV)
Kobbo Santarrosa (later at WAPA-TV and later at WTCV, now at WLII-DT)
Hector Marcano (later at WIPR-TV and later at WTCV)
Antonio Sánchez (previously at SuperSiete, now at La Mega 106.9 FM)
Johnny Ray Rodriguez – comedian (later at WAPA-TV)
Alex Soto (deceased)
Junior Abrams (now at WAPA-TV)
Juan Manuel Lebrón
Carmen Jovet – reporter (later at WAPA-TV and WIPR-TV, now at ABC Puerto Rico)
Angelique Burgos – actress & producer (now at WAPA-TV)
Jay Fonseca (now at WAPA-TV)
Sunshine Logroño (now at WAPA-TV)
Manuel Natal Albelo
Zoe Laboy – political analyst (previously at WAPA-TV)

Technical information

Subchannels
The station's digital signal is multiplexed:

Analog-to-digital conversion
WKAQ-TV shut down its analog signal, over VHF channel 2, on June 12, 2009, the official date in which full-power television stations in the United States transitioned from analog to digital broadcasts under federal mandate. The station's digital signal remained on its pre-transition UHF channel 28. Through the use of PSIP, digital television receivers display the station's virtual channel as its former VHF analog channel 2.

Translators
WKAQ-TV can be seen across Puerto Rico on the following stations:

Liberty–NBCU carriage dispute
On April 4, 2019, at 6 p.m., NBCUniversal became involved in a retransmission consent dispute with Liberty, resulting in the removal of WKAQ-TV and NBCUniversal's cable networks from Liberty's Puerto Rico channel lineup. WKAQ and the NBCU cable networks were restored on April 7, after the two sides reached a new agreement.

References

 Doña Bárbara arrasa en la encuesta de Media Fax Primera Hora - June 28, 2009

External links
 
 
 
 
 

Mass media in San Juan, Puerto Rico
Television pioneers
KAQ-TV
Television channels and stations established in 1954
1954 establishments in Puerto Rico
Telemundo Station Group
NBC network affiliates